The 2022 World RX of Germany was the tenth and final round of the ninth season of the FIA World Rallycross Championship. The event was held at the Nürburgring, Nürburg.Johan Kristoffersson concluded a dominant 2022 FIA World Rallycross Championship campaign with an eighth victory from ten rounds at World RX of Germany (13 November).

World RX1 Championship 

Source

Heats

Progression 

 Race 1

 Race 2

Semi-finals 

 Semi-Final 1

 Semi-Final 2

 Note: Klara Andersson progressed to the Final race as one of two placed trird Semi-Finals drivers with better result in Progression Round, but withdrawn to allow her  teammate Niclas Grönholm to participate for top-5 battle in general classification.

Final 

 Note: Kevin Hansen originally finished second, but later he was disqualified from the final due to a technical infringement.

Standings after the event 

Source

 Note: Only the top five positions are included.

References 

|- style="text-align:center"
|width="35%"|Previous race:2022 World RX of Catalunya
|width="40%"|FIA World Rallycross Championship2022 season
|width="35%"|Next race:2023 season|- style="text-align:center"
|width="35%"|Previous race:2021 World RX of Germany|width="40%"|World RX of Germany|width="35%"|Next race:-'''
|- style="text-align:center"

Germany
World RX
World RX